Henderson Middleton Somerville (March 23, 1837 – September 15, 1915) was a Professor, Associate Justice of the Alabama Supreme Court and a Member of the Board of General Appraisers.

Education and career

Somerville was born on March 23, 1837, in Madison County, Virginia, but his family moved to Alabama in his infancy. He received a Juris Doctor from the Georgetown College of Kentucky and Southwestern University of Tennessee. He received a Bachelor of Arts degree in 1856 from University of Alabama. He received a Master of Laws degree in 1859 from the Cumberland School of Law (then part of Cumberland University, now part of Samford University). Somerville entered private practice in Memphis, Tennessee from 1859 to 1862. He was the editor of Memphis Appeal from 1859 to 1862. He was an associate professor at the University of Alabama from 1862 to 1865. He worked in private practice in Tuscaloosa, Alabama from 1865 to 1873. He became Chair of constitutional, statutory and common law at the University of Alabama in 1873, effectively establishing the University of Alabama School of Law, and continued to hold this position until 1890. He served as an associate justice of the Alabama Supreme Court from 1872 to 1890.

Notable opinion

While serving on the Alabama Supreme Court, Somerville authored the opinion in the case of Parsons v. State, "which announced the modern doctrine of insanity as a disease of the brain", which "was met with great acclaim in both the medical and legal communities".

Federal judicial service

Somerville was nominated by President Benjamin Harrison on July 17, 1890, to the Board of General Appraisers, to a new seat created by 26 Stat. 131. He was confirmed by the United States Senate on July 18, 1890, and received his commission on July 22, 1890. He served as president from 1910 to 1914. His service terminated on September 15, 1915, due to his death in Edgemere, New York. He was succeeded by William C. Adamson.

References

Sources
 

1837 births
1915 deaths
Justices of the Supreme Court of Alabama
People from Madison County, Virginia
Georgetown College (Kentucky) alumni
Rhodes College alumni
University of Alabama alumni
Cumberland School of Law alumni
University of Alabama faculty
Tennessee lawyers
Alabama lawyers
American editors
Members of the Board of General Appraisers
United States Article I federal judges appointed by Benjamin Harrison
19th-century American judges